Tommy Robredo was the defending champion but did not compete that year.

José Acasuso won in the final 2–6, 6–1, 6–3 against Franco Squillari.

Seeds
A champion seed is indicated in bold text while text in italics indicates the round in which that seed was eliminated.

  Jiří Novák (second round)
  Carlos Moyá (semifinals)
  Fabrice Santoro (second round)
  Dominik Hrbatý (second round)
  David Sánchez (first round)
  Olivier Rochus (first round)
  Mikhail Youzhny (quarterfinals)
  Jan Vacek (quarterfinals)

Draw

References
 2002 Idea Prokom Open Draw

Men's Singles
Singles